Thomas, Tommy or Tom Roberts may refer to:

Arts and entertainment
Thomas Roberts (television journalist) (born 1972), American news anchor
Thomas Roberts (painter) (1749–1778), Irish landscape painter             
Thomas Roberts (radical writer) (1765/6–1841), Welsh writer and pamphleteer
Tommy Roberts (designer) (1942–2012), English designer and fashion entrepreneur
Tom Roberts (1856–1931), Australian artist                                 
Tom Roberts, director of the film In Transit

Politicians
Sir Thomas Roberts, 4th Baronet (1658–1706), English MP                    
Thomas Robert Roberts (1869–1934), member of the Queensland Legislative Assembly
Tommy Ed Roberts (1940–2014), American politician and businessman
Tom Roberts (Ohio politician) (born 1952), Democratic member of the Ohio Senate, former member of the Ohio House of Representatives
Tom Roberts (Nevada politician) (born 1964), Nevada politician

Sportspeople
Thomas Roberts (cricketer) (1880–1976), Barbadian cricketer
Thomas Roberts (footballer) (1903–?), English footballer who played for Bristol Rovers
Thomas Roberts (soccer) (born 2001), American soccer player
Tommy Roberts (footballer, born 1898) (1898–1965), English footballer
Tommy Roberts (footballer, born 1927) (1927–2001), English footballer
Tom Roberts (rugby union) (1897–1972), Welsh international rugby union player and coal miner
Tommy Roberts (sports broadcaster) (born 1928), American radio and TV broadcaster

Others
Thomas Francis Roberts (1860–1919), Welsh academic and second Principal of the University College of Wales Aberystwyth                                     
Thomas H. Roberts (1902–1976), American judge
Thomas Roberts (bishop) (1893–1976), Roman Catholic archbishop of Bombay   
Thomas Roberts (television journalist) (born 1972), American news anchor
Thomas Paschall Roberts, American civil engineer and surveyor 
Thomas Sadler Roberts (1858–1946), American physician and ornithologist
Tom Roberts (journalist) (born c. 1950), Canadian radio host
T. J. Roberts (Thomas Jones Roberts), authority on the wildlife of Pakistan
Thomas J. "Long Tom" Roberts, fictional character, companion of Doc Savage